Thinking Out Loud is Bonnie Pink's ninth studio album released under the Warner Music Japan label on July 25, 2007.

Track listing

Charts

Album

Singles

2007 albums
Bonnie Pink albums
Warner Music Japan albums